Jethro Pugh Jr. (July 3, 1944 – January 7, 2015) was an American football defensive tackle in the National Football League (NFL) for the Dallas Cowboys for fourteen seasons. He played college football at Elizabeth City State College.

Early years
Born in Windsor, North Carolina, Pugh graduated from its W. S. Etheridge High School and enrolled at nearby Elizabeth City State College at the age of 16. He played college football for the Vikings on offense and defense and became a two-time All-CIAA defensive end in 1963 and 1964. He is one of five persons to have his jersey retired by the school, now Elizabeth City State University.

In 1979, he was inducted into the Central Intercollegiate Athletic Association (CIAA) Hall of Fame. In 1980, he was inducted into the North Carolina Sports Hall of Fame. In 1981, he was inducted into the ECSU Sports Hall of Fame. In 2010, he was inducted into the National Black College Alumni Hall of Fame. In 2016, he was inducted into the Black College Football Hall of Fame.

Professional career
Pugh was selected in the eleventh round (145th overall) of the 1965 NFL draft, by the Dallas Cowboys, and was also offered a contract to play with the Oakland Raiders of the AFL. He was only 20 years old when he started his professional career as a backup defensive end for the Cowboys. At the end of the 1966 season, he was moved to left defensive tackle replacing Jim Colvin in the starting lineup.

He played with the Cowboys for his entire career, from 1965 through 1978. His 14 seasons represent the fourth-longest career in Cowboys history; only Ed "Too Tall" Jones, Bill Bates, and Mark Tuinei played more years.

In the final seconds of the 1967 NFL Championship Game, the famous Ice Bowl at Green Bay, Pugh was blocked by Packers' guard Jerry Kramer for the game-deciding touchdown. Kramer's block cleared the way for Bart Starr to score on a 1-yard quarterback sneak with 16 seconds remaining, lifting Vince Lombardi's team to a 21–17 victory and an unprecedented third consecutive title game win in  weather at Lambeau Field. It was the second consecutive season that Dallas had fallen to the Packers in the championship game; the previous year was a close game in the Cotton Bowl. Always a team player, Pugh carried on through the 1971 season with a case of appendicitis and delayed his surgery until the offseason, by taking shots of penicillin.

Although he was widely regarded as an excellent player and received All-Pro honors, he was never voted to a Pro Bowl. Pugh's achievements as a professional athlete were largely overshadowed for most of his career by his defensive line teammates, who were Pro Bowl regulars. When Pugh started, he had to compete for attention with future Hall of Famer Bob Lilly and George Andrie; when they retired, Pugh played in the same defensive line with Randy White, Harvey Martin, and Ed "Too Tall" Jones.

Even though he was a physical player against the run, his athleticism enabled him to become an excellent pass rusher for a defensive tackle.

While quarterback sacks were not an official NFL statistic during his career, Pugh is unofficially credited with a career total of 95.5. He led the Cowboys in sacks each season from 1968 to 1972 with a high mark of 15.5 in 1968, a team record that stood until 2010 when DeMarcus Ware reached six straight seasons. He averaged 12½ sacks, during one amazing stretch of his career (1968–1972) and currently ranks sixth on the Cowboys all-time sacks list with 95.5.

Following the 1978 season and Super Bowl XIII, Pugh retired on January 29, 1979, after helping the Cowboys win two Super Bowls, five NFC Championships, qualify for the NFL post-season in 12 out of 14 seasons, and played in a then league record 23 playoff games.

Personal life
Pugh owned a number of western-themed gift shops at Dallas-Fort Worth International Airport in Texas.  He also hosted an annual Jethro Pugh Celebrity Golf Tournament in Dallas to raise funds for the United Negro College Fund. On January 7, 2015, he died at the age of 70 in Dallas, Texas.

References

External links
 
 Top 10: Lilly-White Tough To Separate In Best DT Debate
 North Carolina Sports Hall of Fame bio
 Dallas Morning News – obituary – Jethro Pugh

1944 births
2015 deaths
American football defensive tackles
Dallas Cowboys players
Elizabeth City State Vikings football players
People from Windsor, North Carolina
Players of American football from North Carolina